Psalm 9 is the debut studio album by American doom metal band Trouble, released by Metal Blade Records on March 10, 1984. The album was originally released eponymously and later renamed to Psalm 9 after the release of the band's fourth studio album, which was their 1990 self-titled release. Along with Saint Vitus' self-titled debut album from the same year, Psalm 9 is considered by many critics to be one of the first doom metal releases.

The album has been released on CD on several occasions: in 1991 by Metal Blade Records, both by itself and bundled with Trouble's second studio album The Skull (1985), one year after the release of then-current album Trouble; remastered using the original master tapes and reissued again by Metal Blade in 1994 to commemorate the tenth anniversary of its release; remastered and reissued by Escapi Music on October 26, 2006 with a bonus DVD containing video footage of the band from 1982; and remastered and reissued by Hammerheart Records, cooperating alongside Trouble, Inc., on May 20, 2020.

Recording
Prior to releasing their debut album, Trouble recorded several demos shortly after forming in 1979. The band recorded an early version of the song "The Fall of Lucifer" in 1981. The band's second demo, 1982 Demo, contained early recordings of the songs "The Tempter," "Revelation (Life or Death)," and "Assassin," with Ian Brown performing bass guitar. In 1983, Trouble recorded a concert in Aurora, Illinois at The Beat Club on tape, Trouble Live, during which they performed songs that would appear on several of their studio albums, including seven tracks that were later recorded on Psalm 9. The cassette version of Trouble Live was released in 1983 by Midwest Heavy Metal Promotion with 100 tapes being pressed; it was later released on vinyl by High Roller Records in 2011, being limited to 500 copies, and on CD by Trouble on their label Trouble, Inc.

Psalm 9 was mixed and recorded at Track Record Studios in Los Angeles, California in February 1984. Trouble guitarist Rick Wartell said in April 2013 that the recording of the album was done, "in a week including mixes." In June 2021, producer and engineer Bill Metoyer said the recording studio, "had 2 rooms. One was dead and the room next to it was a totally live sounding room."

Songs
Psalm 9's song titles and lyrical content are primarily based on the Bible. Psalm 9:9 is on the album's back cover. The title track contains verses directly from the King James Version. The name of the opening song, "The Tempter," comes from a line in Matthew 4:3. "The Fall of Lucifer" is primarily about the events of Revelation 12:7-9; the song makes mention of the lines "angel of light" from 2 Corinthians 11:14 and "the dragon," used in several verses in Revelation 12. "Revelation (Life or Death)" references the events of the Book of Revelation in both the title and lyrics. The track "Assassin" was released as a single in 1984 and included a cover of British rock band Cream's 1967 song "Tales of Brave Ulysses" as a B-side.

Track listing

Live recording previously appeared on Trouble Live (1983).
Early recording previously appeared on 1982 Demo.
Demo version previously recorded in 1981.
Song not included on the 1991 CD bundled with The Skull.

Bonus DVD
 "Assassin" (music video)
 "Interview" (part 1)
 "Psalm 9" (music video)
 "Interview" (part 2)
 "Victim of the Insane" (music video)

Personnel
Trouble
 Eric Wagner – vocals
 Bruce Franklin – guitars
 Rick Wartell – guitars
 Sean McAllister – bass
 Jeff Olson – drums

1982 footage
 CableNet – presentation
 Trouble – music
 Eric Anderson – technical director
 Bill Burtis – floor manager
 Wilson Geo, John Utz – cameras

Production
Bill Metoyer – producer, engineer
Brian Slagel – producer
Trouble – producer
Gary Docken – album cover artwork
Joe LaRosa – logo concept
Mastered at JVC Cutting Center in Hollywood, California (original version)
Erwin Hermsen – remastering at Toneshed Recording Studio in The Netherlands (2020 version)

References

Trouble (band) albums
1984 debut albums
Metal Blade Records albums